Line Engaged is a 1935 British, black-and-white, thriller directed by Bernard Mainwaring and starring Bramwell Fletcher, Jane Baxter and Arthur Wontner. It was produced by British Lion Film Corporation.

Plot
Eva Rutland (played by Jane Baxter), the wife of caddish Gordon (Leslie Perrins), is in love with David Morland (Bramwell Fletcher), a successful novelist. David's father, an Inspector (Arthur Wontner) gives his son a cast iron murder plot. Later, when Gordon is shot, it seems David has fulfilled his father's hypothetical musings.

Cast
Bramwell Fletcher as David Morland
Jane Baxter as Eva Rutland
Arthur Wontner as Insp. Morland
Mary Clare as Mrs. Gardner
Leslie Perrins as Gordon Rutland
George Merritt as Sgt. Thomas
Kathleen Harrison as Maid
John Turnbull as Supt. Harrison
Coral Browne as Doreen
Ronald Shiner as Ryan

References

External links
 
 
 

1935 films
1930s thriller films
British black-and-white films
Films directed by Bernard Mainwaring
British thriller films
British Lion Films films
Films produced by Herbert Smith (producer)
1930s English-language films
1930s British films